Mega Piranha (also known as Megapiranha) is a 2010 science fiction comedy horror film produced by The Asylum. 
It was directed by Eric Forsberg and stars Tiffany, Paul Logan and Barry Williams. In the tradition of The Asylum's catalog, this film is a mockbuster of Piranha 3D. It was filmed in Belize, Central America.

Plot 
The film focuses on the Orinoco River in Venezuela, where a strain of genetically modified piranha have escaped into an isolated tributary of the river. Through human interference of the local environment, the megapiranha manage to escape from their isolated spot and swim downstream, killing all that cross their path. The megapiranha gradually make their way towards Florida at the height of the tourist season.

After the outbreak, a team including Special Agent Fitch and Sarah Monroe, work to contain the megapiranhas within Venezuela. They begin to get into trouble with the authorities when they attempt to cross over the Venezuelan border. Not having proper clearance and documentation, Special Agent Fitch resorts to using the diplomacy of his fist and drives off. He is pursued by Colonel Antonio Diaz in a high-speed chase through the jungle. Throughout the chase, Fitch alternates driving a Toyota Camry and Hyundai Elantra while Diaz is seen at different points in a GMC Jimmy, Chevrolet Suburban, Suzuki XL-7, and Ford Explorer. Fitch escapes by stealing a helicopter and heads to the International Super Bunker (ISB). During the journey, the helicopter runs out of fuel and Sarah Monroe rigs the emergency oxygen tank to the fuel line to make it to the ISB safely.

The megapiranhas continue to move north, consuming two battleships and a nuclear submarine. They eventually reach south Florida, where they kill at least five Puerto Ricans on a beach and manage to blow up two hotels. Meanwhile, the only force that can stop them is located at the ISB. After the megapiranhas prove impervious to both torpedoes and depth charges—and even a nuclear torpedo fails to stop them—Special Agent Fitch and Professor Sarah Monroe conclude that the only way to stop the megapiranhas is to face them in their own terrain: underwater. An army of SCUBA divers armed with guns would make the huge fish bleed, causing them to enter a feeding frenzy and kill each other. If this were to fail, then a massive nuclear strike would be used to destroy the megapiranha, as well as most of Florida.

In the middle of the operation, Colonel Diaz arrives in a helicopter, presumably using multiple fuel tanks to do this journey. The Colonel aims to get revenge on Agent Fitch and throws a rope into the water to trick him into climbing up into the enemy helicopter. Fitch, upon his arrival, shoots the pilot in the mouth with a flare gun, which causes the pilot's head to explode. Fitch then uses a homing beacon (which is actually a canister of CO2) to attract a megapiranha, jumping out of the helicopter shortly before it is consumed by the fishy behemoth.

Fitch is pursued by the megapiranha that ate the helicopter, eventually hiding in a reef where the megapiranha is unable to follow. When the piranha opens its mouth, Fitch shoots his gun at the helicopter still in the beast's jaws. The helicopter explodes, killing the fish. The other megapiranha converge on the bloodshed and Fitch is able to escape as the piranha enters a feeding frenzy and begin tearing each other to pieces, seemingly resulting in them wiping themselves out. Sarah and Fitch make out and all is well.

Cast
 Tiffany as Sarah Monroe
 Paul Logan as Jason Fitch
 Barry Williams as Bob Grady
 David Labiosa as Colonel Antonio Diaz
 Jude Gerard Prest as Dr. Higgins
 Jesse Daly as Gordon
 Alessandro Tierno as Sargento Ayudante
 Jay Beyers as Seaman Toby
 Cooper Harris	as Lieutenant Julia
 Gregory Paul Smith as Greg, The Submarine Navigator
 Jonathan Nation as Mort
 Eric Forsberg as US Ambassador Arnold Regis
 William Morse	as Lieutenant Stritch
 Clint Browning as Captain Jonas 
 Lola Forsberg as Stephanie "Steph"
 Robert Don as Rodriguez
 David Dustin Kenyon as Lieutenant Baker
 Sex Henderson	as Submarine Crewman
 Jillian Easton as Jane Fisher / Jane, The Reporter
 Matt Lagan as Submarine Captain Jim
 Anthony Wemyss as Bernie
 John P. Napoleon as Lieutenant Miller
 Sally Elphick	as ISB Tech
 Carl Watts as Captain Decker
 Myles Cranford as Sy
 Ryan Sherman as Jim, The Tech
 Ashley Carr as Half Dead Person
 Fernando Huc as Jose, The Driver
 Natalie Nastulczykova	as Technician

Production 
The mockbuster was produced to capitalise on the 2010 film Piranha 3D. On March 29, 2010, the SyFy Channel released an exclusive sneak peek of a scene from the film in anticipation of its April 10 premiere of the film. On the April 7, 2010 The Asylum released the official trailer online.

Usual Asylum audience may notice the film recycles short clips from other Asylum films, likely due to low production costs and a limited filming schedule. Such clips come from films like Mega Shark vs. Giant Octopus, Journey to Middle Earth, War of the Worlds and Transmorphers: Fall of Man.

Reception 
 
Dread Central wrote about the film: "Now, the question becomes whether Mega Piranha means we should expect a super-sized piranha a la Asylum's Mega Shark Versus Giant Octopus or if they are basing their film around the prehistoric Megapiranha, a toothier, three-foot version of the carnivorous fish that became extinct millions of years ago. Given the big screen 3D remake is about these Megapiranha, I would say odds are high the latter will prove the case.The film reached a 2.2 million audience for its April 10 premiere, making it the channel's most-watched movie of the year. Of those, 807,000 were adults 18–49.

 Soundtrack 
 
The score was composed by Chris Ridenhour and featured the song "Frozen Skies" by Tiffany.

See also
 Mega Shark Versus Giant Octopus – another sea-monster film by The Asylum, starring  Deborah Gibson.Mega Shark Versus Crocosaurus – the 2010 sequel.Mega Python vs. Gatoroid'' – A 2011 film by The Asylum starring both Gibson and Tiffany.

References

External links 
 

2010s American films
2010 comedy horror films
2010s English-language films
2010 films
2010 horror films
2010 independent films
2010s science fiction horror films
2010 television films
American comedy horror films
American horror television films
American natural horror films
American science fiction horror films
Films about piranhas
Films directed by Eric Forsberg
Films set in Belize
Films set in Florida
Films set in Venezuela
Films shot in Belize
Films with screenplays by Eric Forsberg
Mockbuster films
Syfy original films
The Asylum films